Electric Light (Faber and Faber, 2001) is a poetry collection by Seamus Heaney, who received the 1995 Nobel Prize in Literature. The collection explores childhood, nature, and poetry itself.

Part one presents translations and adaptations, occasional and celebratory poems, and verse about travel in the Gaeltacht, the Balkans and Greece. Part two of the collection consists of elegies for poets (Ted Hughes, Joseph Brodsky, and Zbigniew Herbert), and Heaney's relatives and friends.

Heaney has been recorded reading this collection on the Seamus Heaney Collected Poems album.

Contents

 At Toomebridge   
 Perch   
 Lupins   
 Out of the Bag 1   
 Out of the Bag 2   
 Out of the Bag 3   
 Out of the Bag 4   
 Bann Valley Eclogue   
 Montana   
 The Loose Box   
 Turpin Song   
 The Border Campaign   
 Known World   
 The Little Canticles of Asturias 1   
 The Little Canticles of Asturias 2   
 The Little Canticles of Asturias 3   
 Ballynahinch Lake   
 The Clothes Shrine   
 Red, White and Blue 1. Red   
 Red, White and Blue 2. White   
 Red, White and Blue 3. Blue   
 Virgil: Eclogue IX   
 Glanmore Eclogue   
 Sonnets from Hellas 1. Into Arcadia   
 Sonnets from Hellas 2. Conkers   
 Sonnets from Hellas 3. Pylos   
 Sonnets from Hellas 4. The Augean Stables   
 Sonnets from Hellas 5. Castalian Spring   
 Sonnets from Hellas 6. Desfina   
 The Gaeltacht   
 The Real Name   
 The Bookcase   
 Vitruviana   
 Ten Glosses 1. The Marching Season   
 Ten Glosses 2. The Catechism   
 Ten Glosses 3. The Bridge   
 Ten Glosses 4. A Suit   
 Ten Glosses 5. The Party   
 Ten Glosses 6. W. H. Auden 1907-73   
 Ten Glosses 7. The Lesson   
 Ten Glosses 8. Moling's Gloss   
 Ten Glosses 9. Colly   
 Ten Glosses 10. A Norman Simile   
 The Fragment   
 On His Work in the English Tongue (1)   
 On His Work in the English Tongue (2)   
 On His Work in the English Tongue (3)   
 On His Work in the English Tongue (4)   
 On His Work in the English Tongue (5)   
 Audenesque   
 To the Shade of Zbigniew Herbert   
 'Would They Had Stay'd'   
 Late in the Day   
 Arion   
 Bodies and Souls   
 Clonmany to Ahascragh   
 Sruth   
 Seeing the Sick   
 Electric Light

External links
 Lux perpetua: Seamus Heaney on the making of his collection, Electric Light
 Ten Glosses: Verse by Seamus Heaney

2001 poetry books
Irish poetry collections
Poetry by Seamus Heaney
Faber and Faber books